Bimini Baths (also, Bimini Hot Springs and Sanitarium; currently Bimini Slough Ecology Park) was a geothermal mineral water public bathhouse and plunge in what is now Koreatown, Los Angeles, California, US. It was situated just west of downtown, near Third Street and Vermont Avenue. Bimini Baths contained a natatorium, swimming pools, swimming plunge, Turkish baths, a medical treatment department, and bottling works.

History
In the 19th century, the area was a  marsh with  natural hot springs. The waters were discovered during oil drilling exploration. They were discovered by a man who was boring for oil at a depth of  under  of solid white marble. Named after the Bahamian island of Bimini, the venue was owned and operated by Dr. David W. Edwards, president and treasurer of the Bimini Water Company; and David W. Edwards, Jr. served as vice president and secretary. The company was founded December 31, 1902. In 1903, the bath house opened. In the following year, Bimini Hotel was built across the street, and the spring waters were pumped to it. In 1917, J. J. Warrick was manager of the baths and sanitarium. An outdoor pool was added to the baths in 1921. Mexicans were only allowed into the Bimini Baths "when it was too dirty for whites to swim in" it.

Besides the baths, the Bimini Water Company delivered plain and carbonated water to Los Angeles residents. The company provided the water prior to 1915 when the city mains installation occurred. The business went bankrupt in 1951 and the buildings were demolished in 1956.

In the present day, the springs area has become Bimini Slough Ecology Park, featuring native plant stands and a creekbed. The hotel has become headquarters for the Mary Lind Foundation.

Hot springs
The well was reported to yield 100 gallons a minute of water at a temperature of 104 °F. The primary alkalinity of the water gave it a peculiar soft feeling that led to the nickname, "the velvet baths." Containing no sulphur, it carries a large quantity of sodium carbonate and sodium chloride, with some potassium chloride, magnesium carbonate, iron, alumina, and free carbonic acid.

Architecture and fittings
The large wooden building contained a 50-yard main pool, a separate pool for women, and other private pools. In addition, the venue had a cafe, pool observation balcony, and 500 dressing rooms. The original building was destroyed in 1905 during a fire. It was rebuilt in 1906 in Mission revival style by a design of Thornton Fitzhugh. The new construction featured a Turkish Bath, additional pools, and rooftop gardens. The bathing resort also featured a sanitarium. Tub baths and three large swimming plunges were available for the public. A sanitarium hotel nearby was under the same management.

References

Further reading

 Bimini Hot Springs: "California's Most Beautiful Bath House" : "the Velvet Bath"--open the Year Around : Bimini Hot Springs, Los Angeles, Cal., Third Street at Vermont Avenue

External links

Former public baths
Hot springs of California
Koreatown, Los Angeles
History of Los Angeles
Public baths in the United States
Demolished buildings and structures in Los Angeles
1902 establishments in California
1951 disestablishments in California
American companies established in 1902
American companies disestablished in 1951
Buildings and structures demolished in 1956